Rosemarie Whyte (born 8 September 1986) is the 2008 Jamaican national 400m champion. She represented Jamaica at the 2008 Olympic Games in Beijing, China and at the 2012 Summer Olympics in London, Great Britain.  At both Olympics she was part of bronze medal winning Jamaican 4 × 400 m teams.

Competition record

References

Sports Reference

400–50.05
200–22.74

1986 births
Living people
People from Trelawny Parish
Jamaican female sprinters
Athletes (track and field) at the 2008 Summer Olympics
Athletes (track and field) at the 2012 Summer Olympics
Olympic athletes of Jamaica
Olympic silver medalists for Jamaica
World Athletics Championships medalists
Medalists at the 2012 Summer Olympics
Medalists at the 2008 Summer Olympics
Olympic silver medalists in athletics (track and field)
Olympic female sprinters
21st-century Jamaican women